Vittore Benedetto Antonio Trevisan de Saint-Léon (5 June 1818, in Padua – 8 April 1897, in Milan) was an Italian botanist who specialized in cryptogamic flora.

During his career, he was a professor of natural history in Padua. In 1882 he was named president of the Accademia fisio-medica-statistica in Milan. 

In 1848 he circumscribed the genus Romanoa (family Euphorbiaceae)  and in 1861 named the genus Speerschneidera (family Bacidiaceae). In 1888, he circumscribed the (Algae) genus Nocardia (family Nocardiaceae) that is now classed as a bacteria.
Also, he is also the taxonomic authority of the fern genera Blechnopteris (synonym of Blechnum L.), Neurosorus (synonym of Coniogramme Fée,)and Oligocampia (synonym of Athyrium Roth).

Selected works
 Prospetto della flora euganea, 1842.
 Le alghe del tenere udinese, 1844.
 Nomenclator algarum, ou Collection des noms imposés aux plantes de la famille des algues, 1845. 
 Saggio di una monografia delle alghe coccotalle, 1848.
 Caratteri di dodici nuovi generi di licheni, 1853.
 Schema di una nuova classificazione delle epatiche, 1877.
 L'opera lichenologica di Vittore Trevisan (1994).

See also
 :Category:Taxa named by Vittore Benedetto Antonio Trevisan de Saint-Léon

References

1818 births
1897 deaths
Scientists from Padua
Academic staff of the University of Padua
19th-century Italian botanists
Italian phycologists
Italian lichenologists
Pteridologists